{|{{Infobox ship begin
| infobox caption = Utopia of the Seas
| display title = ital
}}

|}Utopia of the Seas is a cruise ship under construction for Royal Caribbean International. She will be the sixth ship in the Oasis Class and is scheduled to enter service in 2024.

 History 
On 18 February 2019, Royal Caribbean announced an order of a sixth and final Oasis-class cruise ship. She will be the first in the class to be powered by liquefied natural gas. 

Royal Caribbean applied to register a trademark for Utopia of the Seas in 2021, out of 23 other ship names.

On 5 April 2022, Royal Caribbean announced the name, Utopia of the Seas'' and the steel cutting ceremony.

The LNG-tanks were built by Wärtsila and delivered in November 2022.

References 

Cruise ship classes
Proposed ships
Royal Caribbean International